Paul Davis may refer to:

Arts
 Paul Marc Davis (born 1974), British actor
 Paul Brooks Davis (born 1938), American painter, illustrator, and graphic designer
 Paul Davis, British musician, keyboardist, co-founder of the band Happy Mondays
 Paul Davis (singer) (1948–2008), American singer-songwriter
 Paul Vincent Davis (puppeteer), (born 1935), American puppeteer

Politics
 Paul Davis (Canadian politician) (born 1961), Premier of Newfoundland and Labrador (2014–2015)
 Paul Davis (Kansas politician) (born 1972), American Democratic politician
 Paul Davis (Maine politician) (born 1947), American politician from Maine

Science
 Paul Davis (programmer) (fl. 1990s), British programmer
 Paul K. Davis (historian) (born 1952), English historian
 Paul K. Davis (policy analyst), policy analyst at the Rand Corporation in Santa Monica, California

Sports
 Paul Davis (cricketer) (born 1981), Australian cricketer
 Paul Davis (footballer, born 1961), English midfielder
 Paul Davis (footballer, born 1962), Jamaican forward
 Paul Davis (footballer, born 1968), English defender
 Paul Davis (basketball) (born 1984), American basketball player
 Paul Davis (fullback) (1925–1989), American football player
 Paul Davis (linebacker) (born 1958), American football player
 Paul E. Davis (1921–2009), American football coach
 Paul J. Davis (1881–1947), American football, basketball, and baseball coach, college athletics administrator
 Paul Davis (rugby league) (born 1971), Australian rugby league player
 Paul Davis (sailor) (born 1958), Norwegian sailor and Olympic medalist
 Paul Davis (baseball), pitching coach for the Seattle Mariners

Characters
 Paul Davis, a character in the TV series Stargate SG-1

See also
 Paul Davies (disambiguation)
 Paul Davys (c. 1600–1672), Irish politician and civil servant